Louis Honoré Arnavon (9 July 1786 – 18 October 1841) was a French soap manufacturer and politician. He served as a city councillor of Marseille in 1830, and as a member of the National Assembly from 8 September 1831 until his resignation on 31 October 1831. He was a Knight of the Legion of Honour.

References

1786 births
1841 deaths
Politicians from Marseille
Members of the 2nd Chamber of Deputies of the July Monarchy
Chevaliers of the Légion d'honneur
Businesspeople from Marseille